A stop-and-go may refer to:

 Stop-and-go route, in American football
 Stop-go, a penalty in motorsport; see 
 Stop & Go, a 1973 album by American musician Hamilton Bohannon
 Traffic wave

See also
 Go-Stop, a Korean card game